Carboxymethyl cellulose (CMC) or cellulose gum is a cellulose derivative with carboxymethyl groups (-CH2-COOH) bound to some of the hydroxyl groups of the glucopyranose monomers that make up the cellulose backbone. It is often used as its sodium salt, sodium carboxymethyl cellulose. It used to be marketed under the name Tylose, a registered trademark of SE Tylose.

Preparation
Carboxymethyl cellulose is synthesized by the alkali-catalyzed reaction of cellulose with chloroacetic acid.  The polar (organic acid) carboxyl groups render the cellulose soluble and chemically reactive. Fabrics made of cellulose—e.g. cotton or viscose rayon—may also be converted into CMC.

Following the initial reaction, the resultant mixture produces approximately 60% CMC and 40% salts (sodium chloride and sodium glycolate); this product is the so-called technical CMC, which is used in detergents. An additional purification process is used to remove salts to produce pure CMC, which is used for alimentary and pharmaceutical applications. An intermediate "semi-purified" grade is also produced, typically used in paper applications such as the restoration of archival documents.

Structure-activity

The functional properties of CMC depend on the degree of substitution of the cellulose structure [i.e., how many of the hydroxyl groups have been converted to carboxymethylene(oxy) groups in the substitution reaction], as well as the chain length of the cellulose backbone structure and the degree of clustering of the carboxymethyl substituents.

Uses

Introduction
CMC is used as a viscosity modifier or thickener, and to stabilize emulsions in various products, both food and non-food. It is used primarily because it has high viscosity, is nontoxic, and is generally considered to be hypoallergenic, as the major source fiber is either softwood pulp or cotton linter. Non-food products include products such as toothpaste, laxatives, diet pills, water-based paints, detergents, textile sizing, reusable heat packs, various paper products, and also in leather crafting to help burnish edges.

Regulated therapeutic uses

In ophthalmology, CMC is used as in artificial tears, in the treatment of treat dry eyes.

Enzymology

Insoluble micro granular CMC is used as a cation-exchange resin in ion-exchange chromatography for the purification of proteins. The level of derivatization is much lower, so the solubility properties of micro granular cellulose are retained, while adding sufficient negatively charged carboxylate groups to bind to positively charged proteins.

Moreover, CMC has also been used extensively to characterize enzyme activity from endoglucanases (part of the cellulase complex); it is a highly specific substrate for endo-acting cellulases, as its structure has been engineered to decrystallize cellulose and create amorphous sites that are ideal for endoglucanase action. CMC is desirable because the catalysis product (glucose) is easily measured using a reducing sugar assay, such as 3,5-dinitrosalicylic acid. Using CMC in enzyme assays is especially important in screening for cellulase enzymes that are needed for more efficient cellulosic ethanol conversion. CMC was misused in early work with cellulase enzymes, as many had associated whole cellulase activity with CMC hydrolysis. As the mechanism of cellulose depolymerization became better understood, it became clear that exo-cellulases are dominant in the degradation of crystalline (e.g. Avicel) and not soluble (e.g. CMC) cellulose.

Food science
CMC is used in food under the E number E466 or E469 (when it is enzymatically hydrolyzed), as a viscosity modifier or thickener, and to stabilize emulsions in various products, including ice cream. CMC is also used extensively in gluten-free and reduced-fat food products.

CMC is used to achieve tartrate or cold stability in wine, an innovation that may save megawatts of electricity used to chill wine in warm climates. It is more stable than metatartaric acid and is very effective in inhibiting tartrate precipitation. It is reported that KHT crystals, in presence of CMC, grow slower and change their morphology. Their shape becomes flatter because they lose 2 of the 7 faces, changing their dimensions. CMC molecules, negatively charged at wine pH, interact with the electropositive surface of the crystals, where potassium ions are accumulated. The slower growth of the crystals and the modification of their shape are caused by the competition between CMC molecules and bitartrate ions for binding to the KHT crystals.

Specific culinary uses
CMC powder is widely used in the ice cream industry, to make ice creams without churning or extremely low temperatures, thereby eliminating the need for conventional churners or salt ice mixes. CMC is used in baking breads and cakes. The use of CMC gives the loaf an improved quality at a reduced cost, by reducing the need of fat. CMC is also used as an emulsifier in biscuits. By dispersing fat uniformly in the dough, it improves the release of the dough from the moulds and cutters, achieving well-shaped biscuits without any distorted edges. It can also help to reduce the amount of egg yolk or fat used in making the biscuits. Use of CMC in candy preparation ensures smooth dispersion in flavor oils, and improves texture and quality. CMC is used in chewing gums, margarines and peanut butter as an emulsifier.

Medical applications

CMC has been used in various medical applications.
 Device for epistaxis (nose bleeding). A poly-vinyl chloride (PVC) balloon is covered by CMC knitted fabric reinforced by nylon. The device is soaked in water to form a gel, which is inserted into the nose of the balloon and inflated. The combination of the inflated balloon and the therapeutic effect of the CMC stops the bleeding.
 Fabric used as a dressing following ear nose and throat surgical procedures.
 Water is added to form a gel, and this gel is inserted into the sinus cavity following surgery.

In veterinary medicine, CMC is used in abdominal surgeries in large animals, particularly horses, to prevent the formation of bowel adhesions.

Other uses

In laundry detergents, it is used as a soil suspension polymer designed to deposit onto cotton and other cellulosic fabrics, creating a negatively charged barrier to soils in the wash solution. CMC is also used as a thickening agent, for example, in the oil-drilling industry as an ingredient of drilling mud, where it acts as a viscosity modifier and water retention agent.

CMC is sometimes used as an electrode binder in advanced battery applications (i.e. lithium ion batteries), especially with graphite anodes. CMC's water solubility allows for less toxic and costly processing than with non-water-soluble binders, like the traditional polyvinylidene fluoride (PVDF), which requires toxic n-methylpyrrolidone (NMP) for processing. CMC is often used in conjunction with styrene-butadiene rubber (SBR) for electrodes requiring extra flexibility, e.g. for use with silicon-containing anodes.

CMC is also used in ice packs to form a eutectic mixture resulting in a lower freezing point, and therefore more cooling capacity than ice.

Aqueous solutions of CMC have also been used to disperse carbon nanotubes, where the long CMC molecules are thought to wrap around the nanotubes, allowing them to be dispersed in water.

In conservation-restoration, it is used as an adhesive or fixative (commercial name Walocel, Klucel).

Adverse reactions

Effects on inflammation, microbiota-related metabolic syndrome, and colitis are a subject of research. Carboxymethyl cellulose is suggested as a possible cause of inflammation of the gut, through alteration of the human gastrointestinal microbiota, and has been suggested as a triggering factor in inflammatory bowel diseases such as ulcerative colitis and Crohn's disease.

While thought to be uncommon, case reports of severe reactions to carboxymethyl cellulose exist. Skin testing is believed to be a useful diagnostic tool for this purpose.

See also
 Croscarmellose sodium
 Hydroxypropyl cellulose
 Methyl cellulose

References

External links
 CMC chemical structure and properties
 MC and CMC: commercial preparations and various uses, including paper conservation; bibliography

Cellulose
Food additives
Cellulose ethers
E-number additives